Sandeep Kewlani is an Indian script writer primarily associated with Hindi cinema.

Kewlani was born in Mumbai, and has a Bachelor of Engineering and Technology from Gyan Vihar School of Engineering and Technology, Rajasthan Technical University.

He was one of the script writers for the 2022 Bollywood thriller Runway 34.

References

External links 
 

Year of birth missing (living people)
Living people
Hindi film producers